The Tatra K2 was the first production articulated tramcar built by ČKD Tatra between 1966 and 1983, following the failure of the experimental prototypes K1 which never entered production. It was noted that the main problem with the K1 was with the new electrical equipment, and therefore the electrical equipment of the T3 (TR 37) was modified and incorporated into the new K2 (UA 12). The prototype entered service in 1966 as Prague tramcar number 7001, where it spent only a short spell, then it was exhibited at MSV 1966 in Brno (International Engineering Trade Fair) with the number 7000, before being transferred to Most, and then again moved to Brno (1968), where it at first had number 607 and later in the year 1969 it was changed to 1007. Production of the K2 on a mass scale started the same year, and many examples was operated in the year 2020, albeit most having been extensively modernised. The modernisation of the K2 fleet in Brno, the biggest customer of the type, included the complete re-modelling of the front end, and the upgrading of their electronic equipment. These modernised examples were labeled K2R, whereby the 'R' stands for czech word rekonstrukce (in translate 'reconstructed'). 2 cars were rebuilt into Pars Nova K3R-N (numbers 1751-1752). From this car was derived a type Tatra K5 in the year 1968.

Variations

K2SU
The K2SU was the version of the K2 which went on sale in Russia, also in 1966.  Production of the type ended prematurely in 1970 as the vehicles were not well suited to the comparatively heavy traffic in Russian cities. Nevertheless, a total of 246 of the type entered service. The only K2SU to remain in active service was in Yekaterinburg where it was retained as an historic vehicle until 1998.

K2YU
Sarajevo was the only city in the former Yugoslavia to receive the K2, where it was labeled the K2YU.  The only differences with the original K2 were in very minor details. One of the most noticeable differences were the corrugated sides and the pantograph, which was in the first series located at the rear of the tram, instead of the front (however it was eventually moved to the front in the 2000s for easier access). Other series already had a pantograph located at the front.

From undelivered shipment of twenty trams K2YU for Sarajevo in 1983, 15 trams ended up in Brno (numbers 1118–1132), 3 were shipped to Bratislava (numbers 7085–7087) and the last 2 to Ostrava (numbers 810–811).

Production
A total of 567 units entered service in the following cities:

Photo gallery

References

External links 

Tatra trams
Tram vehicles of the Czech Republic